The Gura Ocniței oil field is a giant oil field located in Gura Ocniței, Dâmbovița County. It was discovered in 1900 and developed by Petrom. It began production in 1905 and produces oil. The oil field located in Gura Ocniței is the largest in Romania and produced around 1 billion barrels since its commercial opening.

References

Oil fields in Romania